Writer2ePub (W2E) is a free extension for the various implementations of the Writer text processor to create EPUB-formatted e-Books "from any file format that Writer can read". A text to be exported as EPUB has to be saved as OpenDocument (ODT)-formatted text document. Writer2epub is written in OpenOffice Basic. The author of Writer2ePub is Luca “Luke” Calcinai.

External links
 Official home page

Notes

References

EPUB readers
Free application software
Ebooks
OpenOffice
LibreOffice